Patricio Antonio Troncoso Baeza (born 7 June 1993, in Puente Alto) is a Chilean footballer who plays for Segunda División side General Velásquez as an attacking midfielder.

References

External links
 
 
 Patricio Troncoso at playmakerstats.com (English version of ceroacero.es)

1993 births
Living people
People from Santiago
People from Santiago Metropolitan Region
Footballers from Santiago
Chilean footballers
Cobreloa footballers
Deportes Colchagua footballers
Deportes Limache footballers
General Velásquez footballers
Deportes Iberia footballers
Chilean Primera División players
Segunda División Profesional de Chile players
Association football midfielders